The Patent Leather Pug is a 1925 American silent sports drama film directed by Albert S. Rogell and starring Billy Sullivan, Ruth Dwyer, and J.P. McGowan. Completed in 1925, it first premiered in London under the alternative title A Desperate Finish before going on general release in the United States in January 1926.

Cast
 Billy Sullivan as Billy Griffin
 Ruth Dwyer as Catherine Curtis
 J.P. McGowan as James Curtis
 Gloria Grey		
 Vivian Vance	
 John Sinclair 
 Melbourne MacDowell		
 Kit Guard 
 Hayden Stevenson	
 Eddie Diggins

References

Bibliography
 Munden, Kenneth White. The American Film Institute Catalog of Motion Pictures Produced in the United States, Part 1. University of California Press, 1997.

External links

 

1925 films
1920s sports drama films
1920s English-language films
American silent feature films
American sports drama films
American black-and-white films
Rayart Pictures films
Films directed by Albert S. Rogell
1920s American films
Silent American drama films
Silent sports drama films